Natsuiro (なついろ) was a Japanese music unit under Giza Studio in their sublabel D-Go.

Members
Natsuki Morikawa (森川七月) - vocalist
Yoshimi Yamazaki (山崎好詩未) - keyboardist and lyricist
Kana Kitagawa (北川加奈) - pianist

Biography
In 2012, jazz singer Natsuki Morikawa formed music unit with Yoshimi Yamazaki and Kana Kitagawa
At same year, they've made major debut with single Kimi no Namida ni Koishiteru which was used as opening theme for anime Detective Conan
In October 2016 through official website unit has announced hiatus from their music activities
Yoshimi has announced on her blog retiring from modeling and music activities, Natsuki continues with her solo jazz activities  and Kana supports indies band Hachi as keyboardist
During their career, they've released 2 singles and 2 studio albums

Discography

Singles

Albums

References

External links
Official website 
Official Facebook page 
Official YouTube channel 
Official Natsuki Morikawa website 
Official Natsuki Morikawa blog 
Official Kana Kitawaga Twitter 
Official Yoshimi Yamazaki twitter 
Official Yoshimi Yamazaki blog 

Japanese pop music groups
Being Inc. artists
Musical groups established in 2012
Musical groups disestablished in 2016
2012 establishments in Japan